Werner Funck (4 February 1881 – 6 October 1951) was a German stage and film actor, singer and film director.

Selected filmography
Actor
 The Heiress of the Count of Monte Cristo (1919)
 The Girl from Acker Street (1920)
 Impostor (1921)
 You Are the Life (1921)
 Lotte Lore (1921)
 Your Brother's Wife (1921)
 The Black Star (1922)
 Your Bad Reputation (1922)
 Hallig Hooge (1923)
 Battle of the Butterflies (1924)
 Op Hoop van Zegen (1924)
 When Women Keep Silent (1937)
 The Muzzle (1938)
 Robert Koch (1939)
 Twelve Minutes After Midnight (1939)
Director
 Impostor (1921)
 Vineta, the Sunken City (1923)
 The Hungarian Princess (1923)
 The Four Marriages of Matthias Merenus (1924)

References

Bibliography
 Grange, William. Cultural Chronicle of the Weimar Republic. Scarecrow Press, 2008.

External links

1881 births
1951 deaths
German male film actors
German male stage actors
German male musical theatre actors
German male silent film actors
German film directors
Mass media people from Königsberg
University of Königsberg alumni
20th-century German male actors
20th-century German male singers